Tauren Gabriel Wells is an American singer, songwriter, and multi instrumentalist from Houston, Texas who is known for making contemporary Christian music.

Biography 
Wells was a founding member of Royal Tailor along with DJ Cox and Blake Hubbard while they were attending Indiana Bible College in 2004. Jarred Ingram later joined.

In 2016, Wells signed to Provident Label Group - Reunion Records as a solo artist, and he released his first solo single, "Undefeated", in May 2016. It marked a distinct shift from the glossy pop rock sound of Royal Tailor to a more electronic sound. It also featured Reach Records rapper KB and served as the soundtrack for Dude Perfect's "World Records Edition" video on YouTube. Wells released his second solo single, "Love Is Action", in August 2016 and his first solo EP, Undefeated EP, on September 12, 2016. "Love Is Action" was No. 1 on Christian Hot AC/CHR Radio for nine weeks.

In January 2017, Wells released "Hills and Valleys", which reached No. 8 on the Christian Airplay Chart and No. 3 on the Hot Christian Songs chart. The full-length Hills and Valleys was released digitally on June 23 and was released physically on July 21. The fourth single, "When We Pray", was released on October 20, 2017; it peaked at No. 7. He was featured on Crowder's "All My Hope". The single peaked at No. 3 on the Christian Songs chart and No. 1 on the Christian Airplay chart, becoming his first number one.

In 2018, Wells received Grammy nominations for Best Contemporary Christian Performance/Song and Contemporary Christian Album of the Year, but did not win either.

In 2018, he became a worship leader at Lakewood Church, Houston, Texas.

The fifth single, "Known", was released on June 23, 2018. The song peaked at No. 3 on the US Hot Christian Songs chart, becoming his fourth Top 10 single from that chart. It was a huge success on Christian radio, reaching number one on multiple charts including Christian Airplay and Christian AC Songs. It was nominated for the 2019 Grammy Award for Best Contemporary Christian Music Performance/Song. It was also nominated for Top Christian Song at the 2019 Billboard Music Awards.

In late 2019, he released "Miracle", "Perfect Peace", and "Like You Love Me" leading up to Citizen of Heaven, which was released in 2020. It also featured the songs "Famous for (I Believe)", "Millionaire (Good Like That)", and "Close".

In early 2022, he released "Fake It", "Empty", and "Come Home" which were all singles leading up to the release of his 3rd studio album, titled Joy in the Morning.

Personal life 

Wells married his wife Lorna Brittany (née Macey) Wells in 2011. Wells served on the staff of his father-in-law's church in Houston known as Royalwood Church until 2018. Wells and his wife Lorna started the Prisma Worship Arts School, to train musicians. They have 4 children.

Through the school, Prisma offers private coaching in piano, drums, guitar, bass, voice, violin, viola, and cello.

Discography

Studio albums

Live albums

Extended plays

Singles

As lead artist

As featured artist

Promotional singles

Other charted songs

As lead artist

As featured artist

Awards and nominations

Grammy Awards

|-
! scope="row" | 2012
| Black & White (with Royal Tailor)
| rowspan=2|Best Contemporary Christian Music Album
| 
|-
! scope="row" | 2015
| Royal Tailor (with Royal Tailor)
| 
|-
! scope="row" rowspan="2" | 2018
| "Hills and Valleys"
| Best Contemporary Christian Music Performance/Song
| 
|-
| Hills and Valleys
| Best Contemporary Christian Music Album
| 
|-
! scope="row" | 2019
| "Known"
| Best Contemporary Christian Music Performance/Song
| 
|-
! scope="row" | 2020
| "God's Not Done With You (Single Version)"
| Best Contemporary Christian Music Performance/Song
| 
|-
! scope="row" rowspan="2" | 2021
| "Famous For (I Believe)"  (featuring Jenn Johnson) 
| Best Contemporary Christian Music Performance/Song
| 
|-
| Citizen of Heaven
| Best Contemporary Christian Music Album
| 
|-
! scope="row" | 2022
| Citizen of Heaven (Live)
| Best Contemporary Christian Music Album
| 
|}

Billboard Music Awards

|-
! scope="row" | 2019
| "Known"
| Top Christian Song 
| 
|-
! scope="row" | 2021 
| "Famous For (I Believe)" 
| Top Christian Song 
| 
|}

GMA Dove Awards

|-
! scope="row" | 2012
| Royal Tailor (as former frontman)
| rowspan="2"|New Artist of the Year
| 
|-
! scope="row" | 2017
| Tauren Wells
|  
|-
! scope="row" rowspan="3" | 2019
| "Known"
| Song of the Year
| 
|-
| Tauren Wells
| Contemporary Christian Artist of the Year
| 
|-
| "Known"
| Pop/Contemporary Recorded Song of the Year
| 
|-
! scope="row" rowspan="3"| 2020
| Tauren Wells
| Contemporary Christian Artist of the Year
| 
|-
| Citizen of Heaven
| Pop/Contemporary Album of the Year
| 
|-
| Citizen of Heaven
| Short Form Video of the Year
| 
|-
! scope="row" rowspan="3"| 2021
| "Famous For (I Believe)"
| Song of the Year
| 
|-
| Tauren Wells
| Contemporary Christian Artist of the Year
| 
|-
| "Famous For (I Believe)"
| Pop/Contemporary Recorded Song of the Year
| 
|-
! scope="row" | 2022
| "Fake It"
| Short Form Video of the Year (Performance)
| 
|-
|}

References

External links 
 

1986 births
Living people
Essential Records (Christian) artists
21st-century African-American male singers
American performers of Christian music
Performers of contemporary Christian music
Performers of Christian contemporary R&B music